The Rural Municipality of Prairiedale No. 321 is a rural municipality (RM) in the Canadian province of Saskatchewan within Census Division No. 13 and  Division No. 6. Located in the west-central portion of the province, it is adjacent to the Alberta boundary.

History 
The RM of Prairiedale No. 321 incorporated as a rural municipality on December 13, 1909.

Geography

Communities and localities 
The following urban municipalities are surrounded by the RM.

Villages
 Major
 Smiley

The following unincorporated communities are within the RM.

Localities
 Dewar Lake

Demographics 

Government 
The RM of Prairiedale No. 321 is governed by an elected municipal council and an appointed administrator that meets on the second Tuesday of every month. The reeve of the RM is Tim Richelhoff while its administrator is Charlotte Helfrich. The RM's office is located in Major.

References 

P

Division No. 13, Saskatchewan